Bermuda competed at the 2011 Pan American Games in Guadalajara, Mexico from October 14 to 30, 2011. Bermuda competed with 14 athletes in six sports.

Athletics

Bermuda has qualified two athletes. However, Bermuda had originally qualified six athletes but four withdrew to rest and prepare for the 2012 Summer Olympics.

Men

Women

Bowling

Bermuda has qualified a full team of 2 male and 2 female bowlers.

Men
Individual

Pairs

Women
Individual

Pairs

Equestrian

Bermuda has qualified a team of 1 male and 1 female athlete.

Individual jumping

Sailing

Bermuda has qualified an athlete, in the sunfish category.

Open

Swimming

Bermuda has qualified three swimmers.

Men

Women

Triathlon

Bermuda has qualified one male and one female triathlete.

Men

Women

References

Nations at the 2011 Pan American Games
P
2011